Advans SA is a microfinance bank based in Luxembourg active in a number of developing countries. It was established in 2005.

History 
Advans SA launched Advans Côte d'Ivoire In March 2012 and Advans Tunisia in 2013.

In March 2018, Advans SA introduced a new logo. In September 2019, Gaëtan Debuchy was appointed Managing Director/CEO of the bank, and Obinna Ukachukwu Deputy/CEO.

Description 
The organisation is supported by a number of European government development banks that include Netherlands Development Finance Company, European Investment Bank, International Finance Corporation, UK governments CDC Group and the German government KfW.

It is active in Pakistan, Democratic Republic of Congo, Cambodia, Cameroon, Ghana, Nigeria, Tunisia and Myanmar.

References

Microfinance banks
Banks established in 2005
Banks of Luxembourg